"Suzi Q" was the second single by Ammonia, taken from their debut album Mint 400. It was released in December 1995 on  Murmur Records.

Critical reception
Nitsuh Abebe in AllMusic describes "Suzi Q" as "a straightforward pop song". Mark Jenkins in The Washington Post states ""Suzi-Q" possess melodic hooks."

Track listing

Release history

Credits

Personnel
Ammonia
 Allan Balmont — drums
 Simon Hensworth — bass
 Dave Johnstone — guitar, vocals

Production
 Producer, Engineer — Kevin Shirley ("Suzi Q", "Face Down")
 Producer — Ben Glatzer, Ammonia ("Oops")
 Photography — John Webber 
 Cover Design — Simon Alderson, Spin Communications

References

1996 singles
Ammonia (band) songs
1995 songs
Murmur (record label) singles
Song recordings produced by Kevin Shirley